Kathy Chu is an Asia corporate reporter for the Wall Street Journal. She used to be an Asia correspondent for USA Today.

She graduated from University of California, Berkeley with a bachelor of arts, and from Columbia University with a masters of science in journalism.
She has also written for Newsday.

Awards

2016 Online News Association award for “2050 Demographics”  team coverage.
2016 APME Innovation in Journalism Awards, part of “2050 Demographics” team coverage.
2015 Sigma Delta Chi Award, Non Deadline reporting, for “2050 Demographics” series.
2015 New York Press Club, Special Event Reporting, Alibaba coverage.
2014 SABEW award finalist, team tech coverage of Alibaba.
2010  Award for Excellence in Economic Journalism
2009 George Polk Award
2009, 2004 Front Page Award, Newswomen's Club of New York
2009 Excellence in Financial Journalism Award, NYSSCPA
2009 Deadline Club Awards finalist
2008 New York Press Club Award
2008 Clarion Award, Association for Women in Communications

Works
The Busy Family's Guide to Money, Nolo, 2008,

References

External links
Author's Twitter

American women journalists
University of California, Berkeley alumni
Columbia University Graduate School of Journalism alumni
George Polk Award recipients
Living people
Year of birth missing (living people)
USA Today journalists
The Wall Street Journal people
Newsday people